Yenisey railway station is a railway station on the Krasnoyarsk Railway.

Description 
The station has three platforms. An island platform situated between the main railway lines (number 7 and 8), is used for eastbound electric multiple unit commuter trains from Krasnoyarsk, local passenger trains, and trains traveling to Divnogorsk. The other two platforms – an island platform located between railway lines number 1 and 2, and a side platform number 1 (situated next to the railway line number 1) receive electric multiple unit trains traveling exclusively to Divnogorsk. A pedestrian bridge stretches across the railways. The station building is on the southern side of the tracks. The station receives all of the commuter trains, including express trains from Krasnoyarsk to Ilansky and Reshoty. Long-distance trains do not stop at the station, except for trains from Krasnoyarsk to Karabula and Abakan.

The south side of the rail yard has an additional park which is mainly used to store goods wagons.

Notes

Railway stations in Krasnoyarsk Krai
Krasnoyarsk
Railway stations in the Russian Empire opened in 1899